Michael Joseph Deans Hobbs (born 18 October 1987) is a retired professional rugby union player. Hobbs previously played for the Blues and Highlanders in the Super Rugby competition. He also played for the Wellington Lions in the Air New Zealand Cup. His playing positions are First Five-Eighth and Inside Centre.

Personal life
Hobbs was born in Wellington, New Zealand and was Head Boy at Wellington College in 2005. He is the son of former All Black Captain and NZ Rugby chairman Jock Hobbs and the nephew of former All Black fullback and Australian rugby union coach Robbie Deans.

Career
Hobbs represented both New Zealand Schools and New Zealand Under-19s before moving to Brisbane, Australia to undertake study at the University of Queensland. He debuted for the Lions in the 2008 season after spending the two previous years contracted to the Queensland Reds Rugby Academy. He also had a stint with the Melbourne Rebels in the inaugural Australian Rugby Championship season. He went on to be drafted by the Blues for the 2009 Super 14 season.

After starting the 2010 Super rugby season by scoring four tries in the first three games, Hobbs suffered a fractured vertebra in his back and underwent spine surgery in Los Angeles.
He studied at the University of Texas at Austin on exchange while he completed his rehab.

In 2011, Hobbs re-signed with the Blues and NZRU for two more years.

During the 2012 Super rugby season, Hobbs's father Jock died after a long battle with leukaemia. The 2012 ITM Cup saw Hobbs move north from Wellington to North Harbour. He played the first 3 matches before limping out of the Counties match early with ankle damage. Hobbs returned to the side for their final game against Tasman. At the end of the season he was granted an early release from his NZRU contract to take some time away from rugby.

In March 2013, Hobbs signed a one-year deal with the Panasonic Wild Knights in the Japan Top League. Panasonic won both the Japan Top League and Japan Cup championships in the 2013/14 season. At the completion of his contract with Panasonic, Hobbs signed with the NTT DoCoMo Red Hurricanes to remain in Japan for another two seasons.

After helping guide the NTT DoCoMo Red Hurricanes to their first ever win in the Japan Cup wildcard playoffs during the 2014/15 season, Hobbs was unable to take the field in the 2015/16 season due to undergoing shoulder surgery.

In 2016, Hobbs announced that he was taking a break from rugby to study for an MBA at Stanford University.

References

External links
 Blues Profile
 Wellington Lions Player Profile
 itsrugby.co.uk Profile

New Zealand rugby union players
Wellington rugby union players
Highlanders (rugby union) players
1987 births
Living people
North Harbour rugby union players
Blues (Super Rugby) players
Saitama Wild Knights players
NTT DoCoMo Red Hurricanes Osaka players
Rugby union fly-halves
Rugby union centres
Expatriate rugby union players in Japan
New Zealand expatriate sportspeople in Japan
New Zealand expatriate rugby union players
Rugby union players from Wellington City
Deans family
Harper family